Luisa Castro (born 1966, in Foz, Lugo) is a Spanish writer and journalist who has published in Galician and Spanish. She has lived in Barcelona, New York City, Madrid, Santiago de Compostela, Naples and Bordeaux.  She is currently Director of the Instituto Cervantes in Dublin, Ireland.

Her first collection of poems, Odisea definitiva: Libro póstumo (Definitive Odyssey: :Posthumous  Book) was published in 1984. Her next book, Baleas e baleas (1988), was her first work in the Galician language. Her first novel was El somier (Bed Base) (1999).

Prizes 
1986 Premio Hiperión with Los versos del eunuco.
2001 Premio Azorín with El secreto de la lejía.
2006 Premio Biblioteca Breve with La segunda mujer.

Works

Poetry 
 Odisea definitiva: Libro póstumo. Madrid: Arnao, 1984
 Los versos del eunuco. Madrid: Hiperión, 1986. (Premio Hiperión 1986)
 Baleas e baleas. Ferrol: Sociedad de Cultura Valle-Inclán, 1988
 Los seres vivos. 1988
 Los hábitos del artillero. Madrid: Visor Libros S.L., 1989. (Premio Rey Juan Carlos 1990)
 Ballenas. Madrid: Hiperión, 1992
 De mí haré una estatua ecuestre. Madrid: Hiperión, 1997
 Actores vestidos de calle. Madrid: Visor, 2018
 La fortaleza: Poesía reunida (1984-2005). Madrid: Visor, 2019
 Un amor antiguo. Vigo: Galaxia, 2022

Narrative 
 El somier. Barcelona. Anagrama, 1990. (Finalista del VIII Premio Herralde 1990)
 La fiebre amarilla. Barcelona: Anagrama, 1994
 Mi madre en la ventana.' En: Madres e hijas. Freixas, Laura (ed.) . Barcelona: Anagrama, 1996 
 El amor inútil. En Páginas amarillas. Madrid: Lengua de trapo, 1997, pp. 137–145
 No es un regalo. En Vidas de mujer. Monmany, Mercedes (ed.) . Madrid: Alianza, 1998, pp. 245–253. 
 El secreto de la lejía. Barcelona: Planeta, 2001. Novela.  Premio Azorín 2001
 Viajes con mi padre. Barcelona: Planeta, 2003
 Cuando más feliz soy. El Cultural, 26 jun 2003, p. 6
 Una patada en el culo y otros cuentos, 2004.  Premio Torrente Ballester 2004
La segunda mujer, 2006. Seix Barral. Premio Biblioteca Breve.

Essay 
 Carmen Martín Gaite. In Retratos literarios Retratos literarios: Escritores españoles del siglo XX evocados por sus contemporáneos. Freixas, Laura (ed.) . Madrid: Espasa Calpé, 1997, pp. 306–307
 Diario de los años apresurados. Madrid: Hiperión, 1998

References

Bibliography 
 Luisa Castro o la escritura doble. Rodríguez, Béatrice.  In Mujeres novelistas: Jóvenes narradoras de los noventa. Redondo Goicoechea, Alicia (coord.) . Madrid: Narcea, 2003, pp. 97–107.

External links 
Página con poemas de Luisa Castro

1966 births
Living people
Women writers from Galicia (Spain)
Spanish women poets
Spanish women novelists
Spanish essayists
Spanish women essayists